Funeral games are athletic contests held in honor of a recently deceased person.

Funeral Games may also refer to:
 Funeral Games (novel), a novel by Mary Renault
 Funeral Games (play), a play by Joe Orton

See also
 Weddings and Funerals, a playground game
 Game of Death (disambiguation)
 Deathmatch (disambiguation)